KQSE (102.5 FM, Nuevo Mix) is a radio station broadcasting a Spanish variety music format. Licensed to Gypsum, Colorado, United States.  The station is currently owned by Patricia MacDonald Garber and Peter Benedetti, through licensee AlwaysMountainTime, LLC.

History
The station was assigned the call letters KQZR on 6 September 2000.  On 24 December 2007, the station changed its call sign to the current KQSE.

References

External links
 

QSE